Attila Sekerlioglu (born 27 January 1965) is an Austrian former professional footballer who played as a midfielder. After retiring, he moved into management. He has most recently been manager of Austrian club SV Stockerau. He is now a scout for Bayern Munich.

Club career
During his career he played for Elektra Vienna, Austria Vienna (1988–1995), VSE St. Pölten, FC Tirol Innsbruck (1995), St Johnstone (1995–1998), SC Untersiebenbrunn and FC Oslip.

Coaching career
Since retirement, he has moved into coaching and management, in the early 2000s, Sekerlioglu managed Maccabi Vienna, SC Himberg and, until January 2005, SV Horn. Sekerlioglu was appointed manager of ASK Schwadorf, then in the Austrian Regionalliga (Austrian third-tier), in 2005. Schwadorf hosted English giants Arsenal in a pre-season friendly on 31 July 2006. The visitors won 8–1.

Sekerlioglu guided ASK Schwadorf to the championship Austrian Regionalliga East in 2006–07, thus seeing the club promoted for the fifth time in six years, after winning 22 of their 30 league games, but he was fired in August 2007 after the club failed to win their first two games of the 2007–08 season.

He went on to manage VfB Admira Wacker Mödling during the 2007–08 season, but was dismissed in April 2008. He signed for Ghanaian Premier League side Tema Youth in early 2009, but left at the end of the season. He remained in Ghana to become manager of Berekum Chelsea in October 2010.

On 22 August 2011, he was named as head coach of the Austrian Landesliga side SV Stockerau, before leaving the following year to take up his current role with Bayern Munich.

In November 2014, it was reported that he is one of the coaches who applied for India U17 job to manage in 2017 FIFA U-17 World Cup.

Personal life
Sekerlioglu of Turkish descent.

His brother, Cem, is also a footballer. He has a son, also named Attila.

In October 2013, he paid a visit to his former club St Johnstone where he remains well loved and his celebration fondly remembered. He Tweeted the fans that he is returning again in December 2018.

Honours

As a player
Austria Wien
 Austrian Football Bundesliga: 1991, 1992, 1993
 Austrian Cup: 1990, 1992, 1994

As a manager
ASK Schwadorf
 Austrian Regionalliga East: 2007

External links

Attila Plays Hide and Sek (Daily Record article, 2 November 1996)
Attila Told To Sign - Or Quit (Daily Record article, 25 June 1997)
Sek It To 'Em; Attila wants to pile on the agony for struggling Celts (Daily Mirror article, 18 August 1997)

References

1965 births
Living people
Austrian people of Turkish descent
Footballers from Vienna
Association football scouts
Austrian footballers
FK Austria Wien players
FC Tirol Innsbruck players
St Johnstone F.C. players
Austrian Football Bundesliga players
Scottish Football League players
Expatriate footballers in Scotland
Austrian football managers
Expatriate football managers in Ghana
FC Admira Wacker Mödling managers
FC Bayern Munich non-playing staff
Association football defenders
Association football midfielders
SV Horn managers
Austrian expatriate sportspeople in Ghana
Austrian expatriate football managers